England competed at the 1974 British Commonwealth Games in Christchurch, New Zealand, from 24 January - 2 February 1974.  

England finished second in the medal table.

Medal table (top three)

The athletes that competed are listed below.

Athletics

Badminton

Bowls

Boxing

Cycling

Diving

Shooting

Swimming

Weightlifting

Wrestling

References

1974
Nations at the 1974 British Commonwealth Games
British Commonwealth Games